In the Year 2889 (also known as Year 2889) is a 1969 American made-for-television horror science fiction film from American International Pictures about the aftermath of a future nuclear war. The film stars Paul Petersen, Quinn O'Hara, Charla Doherty, Neil Fletcher and Hugh Feagin. AIP commissioned low-budget cult film auteur Larry Buchanan to produce and direct this film as a color remake of Roger Corman's 1956 film Day the World Ended.

Although not set in the year 2889, In the Year 2889s title is borrowed from a short story of the same title by Jules Verne and his son, Michael Verne. (The film however did not follow the Jules Verne story at all.) The screenplay was written for Buchanan by Harold Hoffman.

Plot

A nuclear war has wiped out most of Earth's population. The film follows a group of survivors who are holed up in a secluded valley and must protect themselves from rising radiation levels, mutants, and in some cases, each other.

Cast

Production
AIP gave Buchanan the script of the 1955 Corman film Day the World Ended, originally written by Lou Rusoff, to use for this film, resulting in an almost line-for-line, scene-for-scene remake.

This was Buchanan's fifth Azalea Productions film. It was made by AIP six years after the success of their 1961 Jules Verne adaptation Master of the World. Because this was an even lower budget remake of the earlier low budget Corman film, it needed a new title; AIP already had a registered title available (for a previously unmade Verne project), so it was used on the Buchanan film.

Release

In the Year 2889 was completed and released in 1967 as a made-for-television movie. All promotional materials, including the original listing in TV Guide, have the title as Year 2889, but the on-screen credits give the correct title.

AIP's 1950s special effects technician Paul Blaisdell, who handled the effects in the original AIP film Day the World Ended, happened to come across the film while channel surfing on a Saturday afternoon. He hadn't been told that all of his old AIP films had been remade in Color. He said "I recognized some of the dialogue coming out of the actors' mouths because it was a direct steal from Day the World Ended. I sat there...staring at it, and i just couldn't believe it. I was absolutely spellbound....It's just absolutely unbelievable that they (remade) those.... I don't want to know a damn thing about them. I hope I never see them. One was more than enough!"

Home media
In the Year 2889 was released on DVD by Retromedia Entertainment in 2004, packaged as a double feature with Buchanan's 1969 film 'It's Alive!'.

Reception

Paul Gaita from Allmovie called the film "threadbare and blandly executed", but also noted that the film's pacing, and performances were more professional than the director's previous efforts. Finishing his review, Gaita wrote, "No one will mistake this for a classic of the genre, or even one of Corman's titles, but for Buchanan completists and late movie devotees, it's a harmless and agreeable time-killer."

See also
 List of American films of 1967
 List of films in the public domain in the United States

References

External links
 In the Year 2889 at AllMovie
 
 

1967 films
1960s science fiction films
American International Pictures films
Remakes of American films
Films about cannibalism
1960s English-language films
Films about nuclear war and weapons
Films set in the 29th century
American science fiction television films
American post-apocalyptic films
Films about World War III
1960s American films